This list of jewelry types is a listing of most types of jewelry made.

Hair and Head Ornaments
 Crowns, including:
 Coronet
 Corolla (headgear)
 Shamsa
 Tiara

Neck
 Bolo tie
 Carcanet
 Choker
 Necklace
Pendant
 Torc
 Kalabubu

Arms
 Armlet (upper arm bracelets)
 Bangle
 Bracelet
 Charm bracelet
 Italian charm bracelet
 Friendship bracelet
 Gospel bracelet
 Cuff links

Hands
 Ring
Championship ring
 Class ring
 Engagement ring
Nawarat ring 
 Promise ring
 Pre-engagement ring
Wedding ring
 Slave bracelet

Body
 Belly chain
 Body piercing jewellery
 Breastplate
 Brooch
Earring
 Chatelaine

Feet
 Anklet (ankle bracelets)
 Toe ring

Special functions
 Amulet
 Celibacy vow ring
 Medical alert jewelry
 Membership pin
 Military dog tags
 Pledge pins
 Prayer jewelry
 Japa malas
 Prayer beads
 Prayer rope
 Rosary beads
 Puzzle jewelry
 Puzzle ring
 Signet ring
 Thumb ring
 Gemstone Jewelry

Components
 Cameo
 Emblem
 Findings
 Locket
 Medallion
 Pendant

See also 
 Art jewellery
 Estate jewellery
 Foilbacks
 Diamond Jewellery

 
Design-related lists